Stanisława de Karłowska (8 May 1876 – 9 December 1952) was a Polish-born artist who was a was a founder member of the London Group. Her work combined a modernist style with elements of Polish folk art.

Life and work
Stanisława de Karłowska was the daughter of Aleksander de Karłowski and Paulina (from the Tuchołka family). Her father's family was descended from the Polish nobility (szlachta) and had substantial estates centred on Wszeliwy, near Łowicz, in central Poland. The family had a long history of patriotic activity, and her father had fought with Lajos Kossuth and Józef Bem in the late 1840s. He had also suffered considerable financial loss through the part that he played in the January Uprising of 1863.

Stanisława had trained as an artist in Kraków prior to enrolling at the Académie Julian in Paris, in 1896. In the following summer she went to Jersey to the wedding of a fellow Polish art student Janina Flamm to Eric Forbes-Robertson. It was here that she met the English artist Robert Bevan. By the end of the year she and Bevan were married in Warsaw. They settled in Swiss Cottage, London. She exhibited with the Women's International Art Club and New English Art Club and both exhibited at the Allied Artists' Association in 1908. However, being a woman, she was ineligible for membership of either the Fitzroy Street Group or the later Camden Town Group, of which her husband was a member.

De Karłowska was a founder member of the London Group and showed with them throughout her life. Her work combined a modernist style with elements of Polish folk art. In March 1910, Huntly Carter said of it..."what S. de Karlowska has to say she tells us lucidly in pure and harmonious colour."

Stanisława had two children, Edith Halina (Mrs Charles Baty) and Robert Alexander Bevan. Remaining in London after her husband's death in 1925, she spent the war years in Chester. She travelled to Poland until the late 1930s and would holiday with her daughter's family at Plénauf-Val André in Northern Brittany and at St Nicolas-du-Pelem, further south. Many of her London and Breton paintings can be seen in public collections.

Stanisława de Karłowska died in London in 1952 and is buried in the Bevan family tomb in Cuckfield, Sussex. In common with her husband, de Karlowska sold few of her works during her lifetime. Her estate, including several hundred of Robert Bevan's paintings, drawings and lithographs were left equally to her two children. Many works were presented to public collections over the following twenty years.

She had one solo exhibition during her lifetime at the Adams Gallery in London, in 1935. Her memorial exhibition was also held there in 1954, and in 1968 a joint Bevan - de Karłowska show was held at the Anglo-Polish Society, London.

Stanisława de Karłowska was the great grandmother of the historian of architectural paint and colour, Patrick Baty. A second cousin was Blessed Maria Karłowska.

Works in public collections
Aberdeen Art Gallery;
Brighton Museum and Art Gallery;
Cambridge, Fitzwilliam Museum;
Cardiff, National Museum of Wales;
Eastbourne, Towner Art Gallery;
Glasgow, Kelvingrove Art Gallery;
Huddersfield Library and Art Gallery;
Hull, University Art Collection;
Kettering, The Coach House;
Leeds City Art Gallery;
London, Museum of London;
London, Tate Britain;
Manchester City Art Galleries;
Nottingham Castle Museum;
Oxford, Ashmolean Museum;
Plymouth City Museum and Art Gallery;
Southampton City Art Gallery;
Swindon Museum and Art Gallery;
Wakefield City Art Gallery;
Worthing Museum and Art Gallery;
York City Art Gallery;
South Africa: Port Elizabeth, Nelson Mandela Metropolitan Art Museum

Gallery of works by the artist

Portraits & photos of the artist

References

 Bevan, R.A., Robert Bevan 1865-1925. A memoir by his son. Studio Vista, London. 1965.
 Chamot, Mary, Dennis Farr and Martin Butlin, The Modern British Paintings, Drawings and Sculpture. Oldbourne Press, London. 1964.
 Foster, Alicia. Tate Women Artists. Tate Publishing, London. 2004.
 The New Age, Vol 6, No. 19, p. 452.
 Stenlake, Frances. Robert Bevan from Gauguin to Camden Town. Unicorn Press. 2008
 Yeates, John. NW1. The Camden Town Artists. A social history. Somerset, Heale Gallery. 2007.

External links

 Helena Bonett, 'Stanislawa de Karlowska 1876–1952', artist biography, January 2011, in Helena Bonett, Ysanne Holt, Jennifer Mundy (eds.), The Camden Town Group in Context, Tate, May 2012, Stanislawa de Karlowska 1876–1952
 The Artists of Camden Town - to download book
 Tate Britain–Berkeley Square
 Bridgeman Art Library
 Review of 2011 show at the National Portrait Gallery, London
 

1876 births
1952 deaths
19th-century Polish painters
20th-century Polish painters
Académie Julian alumni
20th-century Polish women artists
19th-century Polish women artists
Bevan family